Vestfold District Court is a district court located in Vestfold og Telemark county, Norway. This court is based at three different courthouses which are located in Tønsberg, Larvik, and Horten. The court serves the eastern part of the county which includes 5 municipalities. The court in Larvik accepts cases from the municipalities of Larvik and Sandefjord. The court in Horten accepts cases from the municipalities of Horten and Holmestrand. The court in Tønsberg accepts cases from the municipalities of Tønsberg and Færder. The court is subordinate to the Agder Court of Appeal.

The court is led by a chief judge and several other judges. The court is a court of first instance. Its judicial duties are mainly to settle criminal cases and to resolve civil litigation as well as bankruptcy. The administration and registration tasks of the court include death registration, issuing certain certificates, performing duties of a notary public, and officiating civil wedding ceremonies. Cases from this court are heard by a combination of professional judges and lay judges.

History
This court was established on 1 January 2019 after the old Larvik District Court, Nordre Vestfold District Court, Sandefjord District Court and Tønsberg District Court were all merged into one court. The new district court system continued to use the courthouses from the predecessor courts. The courthouse in Sandefjord was permanently closed on 17 December 2020.

References

District courts of Norway
2019 establishments in Norway
Organisations based in Tønsberg
Organisations based in Horten
Organisations based in Larvik